Terry Young is a male international table tennis player from England.

Table tennis career
He represented England in the 2000 World Table Tennis Championships and 2001 World Table Tennis Championships in the Swaythling Cup (men's team event).

He won a Commonwealth Games team gold in 2002 and has won two English National Table Tennis Championships doubles titles in 2003 and 2005.

See also
 List of England players at the World Team Table Tennis Championships

References

Living people
1978 births
English male table tennis players
Commonwealth Games gold medallists for England
Table tennis players at the 2002 Commonwealth Games
Commonwealth Games medallists in table tennis
Medallists at the 2002 Commonwealth Games